The Beaumont Formation is a geologic formation in Texas. It preserves fossils dating back to the Pleistocene  period.

See also

 List of fossiliferous stratigraphic units in Texas
 Paleontology in Texas

References
 

Geologic formations of Texas